Shazam is the second studio album by English rock band the Move, released in February 1970 by Regal Zonophone. The album marked a bridge between the band's quirky late 1960s pop singles and the more aggressive, hard rock, long-form style of their later albums. It was the last Move album to feature vocalist Carl Wayne, and the first to feature bassist/vocalist Rick Price.

Background and recording
The "Blackberry Way" single hit No. 1 in the UK in 1969. The single's success reinforced bassist/vocalist Trevor Burton's feelings that the band had become too commercial. He quit shortly thereafter and replaced by Rick Price, and the February 1969 American tour was cancelled because of this. The band spent most of 1969 on the cabaret circuit in England, which vocalist Carl Wayne eventually adjusted to but Rick Price and guitarist/vocalist Roy Wood loathed. When a new American tour was launched later that year, it was a financial failure and a logistical farce—due to shoddy planning, the band was forced to race across the country by car (and a U-Haul trailer) to make very few dates. During this time, they loosened up their performance and played at a louder volume, and the relationship between Wood and Wayne - who had always had different personalities and temperaments - was being severely tested.

Due in part to their hectic touring schedule, by the time of the recording sessions Wood (at the time the band's only songwriter) had only one new song written, "Beautiful Daughter". As such, though numerous spoken word sections were added to both pad out the album's length and give it the appearance of a concept, Shazam was essentially the Move's 1969 stage act captured on record: a mixture of California psychedelia, heavy metal riffs, thundering drums, and interpolations from classic composers. The shortage of new material also meant that, even with the band re-recording a track from their first album ("Cherry Blossom Clinic"), the bulk of Shazam (33 of its 39 minutes) had to be devoted to cover songs. These include a medley of works which were in the public domain and so could be listed on the album as part of Wood's composition "Cherry Blossom Clinic Revisited" without giving any credit to their composers.

The band's management wanted Wood to be the album's producer, but the other members of the band objected and virtually the entire band ended up getting involved in the production. Wayne in particular had been frustrated at his shrinking voice in the group, and was allowed to choose most of the cover songs included on the album.

"Hello Susie" had previously been a hit for Amen Corner, though their faster, more pop-oriented version was markedly different from the Move's heavy metal treatment. "Cherry Blossom Clinic Revisited" is a re-recording of "Cherry Blossom Clinic", taken at a slower pace, not a sequel song. The first verse was diffidently spoken by Wayne, and the track was recorded without any strings or brass.

Wood recalled that the album's one new song, "Beautiful Daughter", "just sort of happened. I think I based it around the chord sequences on that. I based the whole song around the chords. I did a lot of open string work on that and it worked quite well."

While drummer Bev Bevan regards this as his favorite Move album, Wood said the album doesn't hold up, adding that "I think it was probably down to the fact that we weren't together personally as a band. We weren't pulling in the same direction. I always feel if you're having a good time in the studio it actually comes across on the tape and that was a bit of a miserable album for us."

Wood reckoned The Move had gone as far as it could go, short of breaking through in America, and wanted to launch a new strings-and-rock project with Jeff Lynne, which would become The Electric Light Orchestra (ELO). Wayne, however, still saw potential in the band and wanted to return to their roots with short sharp tracks. He even attempted to persuade the others to allow him to continue the Move without them, possibly by bringing Burton and original bassist Ace Kefford back in the band, while Wood, Price, and Bevan would all move on to ELO project and Wood would continue to write songs for The Move, but Price, Wood and Bevan rejected his suggestion.

According to Wayne, his reason for leaving the band was Wood's dislike for playing the cabaret circuit, with the final trigger being a show in Sheffield in January 1970, in which Wood threw a glass at a cabaret patron. Wayne quit the band just before Shazam was released, and was replaced by guitarist/piano/vocalist/songwriter Jeff Lynne who, having rejected Wood's first invitation to join The Move because he wanted to stay with The Idle Race, agreed to join on the condition that they retire The Move and focus full-time on ELO.

Cover art
The cover was drawn by Mike Sheridan, Roy Wood's former bandmate in Mike Sheridan and the Nightriders.

Release
The album was not a commercial success in the UK. The hit single "Brontosaurus" debuted a fortnight after Shazam hit the stores, and was the first recording to feature Lynne, stealing considerable press and record buyer attention away from Shazam. In the US, when it debuted on A&M Records, the heavy feel, tight harmonies, and extended solos made it a cult favorite and the record that introduced most American fans to the band. It also proved to be a stylistic template for successful 1970s bands, such as Cheap Trick and Kiss.

Critical reception 

Reviewing for The Village Voice in 1970, Robert Christgau said the album is "one version of an overly self-conscious mode (in the perception if not the creation) which I call stupid-rock. This is compelling when played loud, but it is also full of annoying distractions, musical and otherwise." John Mendelsohn of Rolling Stone gave the album a positive review, ending with a plea "Do what you can to prevent this from being the last Move album... ...The Move must be kept going to give us more albums like this one".

In a retrospective review, AllMusic editor Stephen Thomas Erlewine said the "short-yet-sprawling" album reflected the band's growth into a "muscular and weirder" group. Erlewine said that, although the variety of musical ideas may be intimidating to listeners, the album rewards repeated listens, and the Move "may never have been better than they are here".

Track listing

Personnel
Roy Wood - vocals, guitars, keyboards
Bev Bevan - drums, percussion
Carl Wayne - vocals
Rick Price - vocals, bass
Trevor Burton - bass (prior to leaving the band, which tracks unknown)
Tony Visconti - bass on "Beautiful Daughter"
"Beautiful Daughter" features an uncredited string quartet.

References 

1970 albums
Albums produced by Roy Wood
The Move albums
Regal Zonophone Records albums
A&M Records albums